Roswitha was a 10th-century German canoness, dramatist and poet.

Roswitha may also refer to:
 Roswitha Prize, a German-language literature prize for women
 Roswitha (genus), a genus of beetles
 615 Roswitha, a Main Belt asteroid

Given name

 Roswitha März (born 1940), German mathematician
 Roswitha Esser (born 1941), West German canoeist
 Roswitha Hecke (born 1944), German photographer and photojournalist
 Roswitha Krause (born 1949), German swimmer and handball player
 Roswitha Spohr, West German sprint canoeist
 Roswitha Beier (born 1956), German swimmer
 Roswitha Blind, German mathematician and politician
 Roswitha Fischer, Italian luger
 Roswitha Eberl, East German sprint canoeist
 Roswitha Steiner (born 1963), Austrian Alpine skier